Gregory (died 739/740) was a nephew of King Liutprand of the Lombards, who appointed him Duke of Benevento in 733 or thereabouts after removing both the usurper Audelais and the minor Gisulf II. He governed the "people of the Samnites," as Paul the Deacon calls the Beneventans, for seven years. 

He was married to Giselperga.

Sources
Paul the Deacon. Historia Langobardorum. Available at Northvegr.

Notes

740 deaths
Dukes of Benevento
8th-century rulers in Europe
8th-century Lombard people
Year of birth unknown